Sam George (born June 29, 1970 in Mission Viejo, California) is a retired American soccer midfielder who played two seasons in the Western Soccer Alliance, three in the Continental Indoor Soccer League and four in Major League Soccer.

Youth
George grew up playing soccer with the North Huntington Beach Futbol Club.  In 1988, he entered UCLA where he played on the Bruins soccer team from 1988 to 1991.  In 1990, the Bruins won the NCAA Men's Soccer Championship.

Professional
In 1988, George joined the Los Angeles Heat of the Western Soccer Alliance before entering UCLA.  He played for the Heat again 1989 during the collegiate off season.  Following his graduation from UCLA in 1992, there is a one-year gap in George’s career records.  In 1993, the expansion Los Angeles United of the Continental Indoor Soccer League (CISL) drafted George in the first round of the CISL Amateur Draft.  In 1994, new ownership moved United to Anaheim, California and renamed the team the Anaheim Splash.  George played through the 1996 season with the Splash.  In 
New England Revolution of Major League Soccer selected George in the third round (22nd overall) of the Supplemental Draft.  He played fifteen games with the Revolution and was loaned to the Worcester Wildfire of USISL.  On August 13, 1997, the Revolution traded George to the Tampa Bay Mutiny and he played seven games with the Mutiny.  He remained with Tampa Bay until August 2, 1999 when he was traded, along with Paul Dougherty and a draft pick to the Chicago Fire for Ritchie Kotschau and Manny Lagos.  He finished the 1999 season in Chicago, then played sixteen games in 2000.  He announced his retirement from playing on November 3, 2000.

Post playing career
Since retiring, George worked at the Newport Printing Service Company in Irvine, California and has coached youth soccer.

References

External links
 New England Revolution profile
 Sam George MLS stats

1970 births
Living people
American soccer players
UCLA Bruins men's soccer players
Western Soccer Alliance players
Los Angeles Heat players
Continental Indoor Soccer League players
Los Angeles United players
Anaheim Splash players
New England Revolution players
People from San Luis Obispo County, California
Tampa Bay Mutiny players
Chicago Fire FC players
Worcester Wildfire players
Major League Soccer players
A-League (1995–2004) players
New England Revolution draft picks
Soccer players from California
Association football midfielders